Józef Grzybowski (March 17, 1869 – February 17, 1922), was a Polish geologist, paleontologist and foraminiferologist.

Grzybowski was born in Kraków.  He was educated at Jagiellonian University where he became the director of the Paleontological Laboratory. Grzybowski was a Professor of Palaeontology at the Jagiellonian University in Kraków, a pioneer in the use of microfossils for stratigraphical applications.

External links
 Web page of Józef Grzybowski Foundation

1869 births
1922 deaths
Jagiellonian University alumni
Academic staff of Jagiellonian University
20th-century Polish geologists
Polish paleontologists
Scientists from Kraków
Micropaleontologists
19th-century Polish geologists